Skodje (pronunciation: [skɔʏə] or [skøʏə]) is a former municipality in Møre og Romsdal county, Norway. It was part of the Sunnmøre region. The administrative centre was the village of Skodje. The other main village in the municipality was Valle.

The European Route E39/E136 highway runs through the municipality, connecting it to the nearby cities of Ålesund and Molde.

At the time if its dissolution in 2020, the  municipality is the 365th largest by area out of the 422 municipalities in Norway. Skodje is the 211th most populous municipality in Norway with a population of 4,680.

General information

The municipality of Skodje was established in 1849 when it was separated from the large Borgund municipality. The initial population of Skodje was 2,170. On 1 January 1902, the northern district of Skodje was separated to form the new Vatne Municipality. This left Skodje with 1,551 residents. During the 1960s, there were many municipal mergers across Norway due to the work of the Schei Committee. On 1 January 1965, there was a merger between Stordal Municipality, Ørskog Municipality, and Skodje Municipality, creating a new, large Ørskog Municipality. This was merger was short-lived. On 1 January 1977, the merger was reversed all three municipalities were separated once again. This left the newly reconstituted Skodje Municipality with a population of 2,634.

On 1 January 2020, the municipality of Skodje was merged with Haram Municipality, Ørskog Municipality, Sandøy Municipality, and Ålesund Municipality to form one large municipality of Ålesund.

Name
The municipality (originally the parish) is named after the old Skodje farm, since the first Skodje Church was built there. The meaning of the first element is unknown, but the last element is vin which means "meadow" or "pasture". Before 1879, the name was written Skoue.

Coat of arms
The coat of arms was granted on 19 June 1987. The arms show the local Skodje Bridge, a very old bridge which crosses over the Straumen river, a major architectural feat at its time.

Churches
The Church of Norway had one parish within the municipality of Skodje. It is part of the Austre Sunnmøre prosti (deanery) in the Diocese of Møre.

Geography
The municipality of Skodje shares land borders with Haram Municipality to the north, Vestnes Municipality to the northeast, Ørskog Municipality to the southeast, and Ålesund Municipality to the west. Across the Storfjorden to the south is Sykkylven Municipality. Skodje municipality is located on the mainland and also on part of the island of Oksenøya, plus many small surrounding islands. The Ellingsøyfjorden cuts into the municipality from the west.

Government
All municipalities in Norway, including Skodje, are responsible for primary education (through 10th grade), outpatient health services, senior citizen services, unemployment and other social services, zoning, economic development, and municipal roads. The municipality is governed by a municipal council of elected representatives, which in turn elect a mayor.  The municipality falls under the Sunnmøre District Court and the Frostating Court of Appeal.

Municipal council
The municipal council of Skodje is made up of 21 representatives that are elected to four year terms. The party breakdown for the final municipal council was as follows:

Economy
Skodje's economy is mostly based on agriculture and forestry, but there is also industry, lumber, and furniture-industry located there.  Some industries have relocated from Ålesund to Skodje. Skodje has a young population, where 60% of the people are under the age of 40.

See also
List of former municipalities of Norway

References

External links

Municipal fact sheet from Statistics Norway 

 
Ålesund
Former municipalities of Norway
1849 establishments in Norway
1965 disestablishments in Norway
1977 establishments in Norway
2020 disestablishments in Norway
Populated places disestablished in 2020